The 2019 Coke Zero Sugar 400 was a Monster Energy NASCAR Cup Series race that was held on July 7, 2019 at Daytona International Speedway in Daytona Beach, Florida. Contested over 127 of the scheduled 160 laps on the  superspeedway, it was the 18th race of the 2019 Monster Energy NASCAR Cup Series season. The race was postponed from Saturday, July 6 to Sunday, July 7, due to rain. 20-year-old Justin Haley won the race, recording his first career Cup Series win and the first for Spire Motorsports after the race was called due to rain.

Report

Background

The race was held at Daytona International Speedway, a race track located in Daytona Beach, Florida, United States. Since opening in 1959, the track is the home of the Daytona 500, the most prestigious race in NASCAR. In addition to NASCAR, the track also hosts races of ARCA, AMA Superbike, USCC, SCCA, and Motocross. The track's  infield includes the  Lake Lloyd, which has hosted powerboat racing. The speedway is owned and operated by International Speedway Corporation.

The track was built in 1959 by NASCAR founder William "Bill" France, Sr. to host racing held at the former Daytona Beach Road Course. His banked design permitted higher speeds and gave fans a better view of the cars. Lights were installed around the track in 1998 and today, it is the third-largest single lit outdoor sports facility. The speedway has been renovated three times, with the infield renovated in 2004 and the track repaved twice — in 1978 and in 2010.

On January 22, 2013, the track unveiled artist depictions of a renovated speedway. On July 5 of that year, ground was broken for a project that would remove the backstretch seating and completely redevelop the frontstretch seating. The renovation to the speedway is being worked on by Rossetti Architects. The project, named "Daytona Rising", was completed in January 2016, and it costed US $400 million, placing emphasis on improving fan experience with five expanded and redesigned fan entrances (called "injectors") as well as wider and more comfortable seating with more restrooms and concession stands. After the renovations, the track's grandstands include 101,000 permanent seats with the ability to increase permanent seating to 125,000. The project was completed before the start of Speedweeks 2016.

Entry list
 (i) denotes driver who are ineligible for series driver points.
 (R) denotes rookie driver.

Practice

First practice

Final practice

Qualifying
Qualifying for Friday was cancelled due to inclement weather and Joey Logano, the point leader, was awarded the pole as a result.

Starting Lineup

Race

Stage results

Stage One
Laps: 50

Stage Two
Laps: 50

Final stage results

Stage Three
Laps: 27

The Big One occurred on lap 119 when Clint Bowyer and Austin Dillon battled for the lead in intense drafting packs, leading to a 17-car crash.  Kurt Busch was the leader when most leaders pitted, but when at the end of Lap 127, officials gave the signal the race would restart on the ensuing lap, Busch pitted, handing the lead to Justin Haley. When lightning was detected while the cars were on the backstretch working Lap 128, the safety truck turned on its lights and immediately sent the cars to the pit lane.  After two further attempts to restart the race were aborted because of lightning, more rain led NASCAR to declare the race official.  NASCAR then spent considerable time to score all penalties assessed for pitting before pit lane was opened before an official result was declared. Haley was declared the winner.

Race statistics
 Lead changes: 24 among 14 different drivers
 Cautions/Laps: 6 for 25
 Red flags: 1
 Time of race: 2 hours, 14 minutes and 58 seconds
 Average speed:

Media

Television
NBC Sports covered the race on the television side. Rick Allen, 2000 Coke Zero 400 winner Jeff Burton and two-time Coke Zero 400 winner Dale Earnhardt Jr. called in the booth for the race. Steve Letarte called from the NBC Peacock Pit Box on pit road. Dave Burns, Marty Snider and Kelli Stavast reported from pit lane during the race. During the lengthy red flag for lightning, television coverage eventually switched over to NBCSN, where the official announcement of the end of the race was made.

Radio
MRN had the radio call for the race which was also simulcast on Sirius XM NASCAR Radio.

Standings after the race

Drivers' Championship standings

Manufacturers' Championship standings

Note: Only the first 16 positions are included for the driver standings.
. – Driver has clinched a position in the Monster Energy NASCAR Cup Series playoffs.

References

2019 Coke Zero Sugar 400
2019 Monster Energy NASCAR Cup Series
2019 in sports in Florida
Coke Zero Sugar 400